Liza Colón-Zayas (born 1972) is an American actress and playwright. She is best known for playing Tina on The Bear.

Early life and education
Liza Colón was born and raised in The Bronx borough of New York City in 1972 and began her career off-Broadway. She broke into mainstream theatre when she wrote, produced, and starred in a one-woman show titled Sistah Supreme, a semi-autobiographical play in which she chronicles growing up as a Latina woman in New York during the 1970s and 1980s.

Career
Colón-Zayas has been a member of the LAByrinth Theatre Company, a New York-based traveling actors' group, since 1992. On stage, she originated the role of Norca in the off-Broadway productions of Our Lady of 121st Street and appeared in In Arabia, We'd All Be Kings (co-starring Ana Ortiz and directed by Philip Seymour Hoffman).

She has also appeared in television series such as Sex and the City, Law & Order: Special Victims Unit, and Blue Bloods episode 124, "Stomping Grounds" (in the latter, as Ana Baez, the sister of Detective Maria Baez). She guest starred in Dexter (season 5, episode 8), as the mother of Yasmin Aragon, a snitch to the detectives investigating the "Santa Muerte killings." She came into the detachment to identify her daughter's body, after she was killed during a sting by Miami Metro Homicide. On the big screen, she played a passenger in the film United 93 (2006) and Judge Angel Rodriguez in Righteous Kill (2008). In 2016, she played Dawn in the horror film The Purge: Election Year.

Personal life
Colón-Zayas is married to actor David Zayas, known for his role as Angel Batista on Showtime's Dexter.

Filmography

Film

Television

See also 

List of Puerto Ricans

References

External links
 
 

American actresses of Puerto Rican descent
American film actresses
American stage actresses
American television actresses
Actresses from New York City
Living people
People from the Bronx
1972 births